The 2007 Ironman 70.3 World Championship was a triathlon competition held in Clearwater, Florida on November 10, 2007. The championship was sponsored by Ford and organized by the World Triathlon Corporation (WTC). The championship was the culmination of the Ironman 70.3 series of events that occurred from November 2006 through September 2007. Athletes, both professional and amateur, earned a spot in the championship race by qualifying in races throughout the 70.3 series.

Medallists

Men

Women

Qualification
The 2007 Ironman 70.3 Series featured 23 events that enabled qualification to the 2007 World Championship event. In the second year of WTC's 70.3 race series the number of races increased as the series expanded outside of North America with new events such as those in Austria, Germany, Monaco, Singapore, and Switzerland.

Qualifying for the 2007 Ironman 70.3 Championship was based on allocated slots available at each qualifying event, usually 50, though could vary from race to race. Slots were allocated to amateur triathletes in each age group category, male and female, with the number of slots given out based on that category's proportional representation of the overall field. Each age group category would be tentatively allocated one qualifying spot in each qualifying event. Professional athletes could qualify for the championships by obtaining one of the 10% of the available qualifying spots at that event. Thus, if 50 available spots were allocated, 45 slots would be distributed among the amateur athletes and 5 were available to pro athletes.

Qualifying Ironman 70.3s

†

2007 Ironman 70.3 Series results

Men

Women

References

External links
Ironman 70.3 Series website

Ironman World Championship
Ironman
Triathlon competitions in the United States
2007 in American sports
Sports competitions in Florida
2007 in sports in Florida
Sports in Clearwater, Florida